Rodrigo Fabiano Mendes (born August 9, 1975 in Uberaba), or simply Rodrigo Mendes or Rodrigo, is a Brazilian former left winger, he last played for Novo Hamburgo, formerly played for Fortaleza who was released on 5 June 2009 due to successive muscular problems on both tights.

Club statistics

Honours 
 Guanabara Cup: 1995
 Rio de Janeiro State League: 1995, 1999
 Japanese League: 1997
 Paraná State League: 1998
 Mercosul Cup:1999
 Rio de Janeiro's Cup: 2000
 Rio Grande do Sul State League: 2001
 Brazilian Cup: 2001
 AFC Champions League : 2003
 United Arab Emirates League: 2004
 Ceara's Cup: 2009

Personal Honours 
 Copa Libertadores Top Scorer : 2002

Contract 
 18 September 2009 to 31 December 2009

External links 
 

 CBF  
 outerspace  
 gremioblog 

1975 births
Living people
Brazilian footballers
Brazilian expatriate footballers
CR Flamengo footballers
Grêmio Foot-Ball Porto Alegrense players
Kashima Antlers players
Club Athletico Paranaense players
Fortaleza Esporte Clube players
Oita Trinita players
Al Ain FC players
Al-Gharafa SC players
Sharjah FC players
Expatriate footballers in Japan
Expatriate footballers in the United Arab Emirates
J1 League players
Brazilian expatriate sportspeople in the United Arab Emirates
People from Uberaba
UAE Pro League players
Qatar Stars League players
Association football forwards
Sportspeople from Minas Gerais